Gundala may refer to:

Films 

Gundala (film), a 2019 Indonesian superhero film
 Gundala the Son of Lightning, an upcoming Indonesian superhero film

Places 
 Gundala, a historical village since the princely state of Gondal, India
Gundala, a village near Mundra town of Kutch district, Gujarat, India
 Gundala, Bhadradri Kothagudem district, a mandal in Telangana, India
 Gundala, Jangaon district, a mandal in Telangana, India
 Gundala, Mahabubnagar district, a village in Atmakur Mandal
 Gundala, Ranga Reddy district, a village in Ranga Reddy district, Telangana, India
Gundalapadu, a village in Phirangipuram mandal, Guntur district, Andhra Pradesh, India